Isaac Vanderbeck Fowler (August 20, 1818 – September 29, 1869) was thrice the Grand Sachem of the Tammany Society, better known as Tammany Hall, from 1848–1850, 1857–1858, and 1858–1859, the last term shared with William M. "Boss" Tweed. He was appointed Postmaster of New York City by President Franklin Pierce on April 1, 1853 and was also a delegate from New York to the 1860 Democratic National Convention.

Fowler was an unusual leader of the Tammany Society as he was a college graduate. He also moved in the better social circles, and convinced a number of rich young men to join the organization.

Biography
He was born on August 20, 1818.

However, Fowler had long lived beyond his means, and on May 10, 1860 was removed from his office as Postmaster and a warrant was issued for his arrest, accusing him of embezzling $155,554. Fowler, who had also produced the $2,500 to buy off the Republican  Peter P. Voorhis on city's Board of Supervisors, was staying at a hotel when the warrant for his arrest was issued. The responsibility for Fowler's arrest was given to Isaiah Rynders, another Tammany operative who was serving as a United States marshal at the time. Rynders made enough ruckus upon entering the hotel where Fowler was staying that Fowler was able to escape to Mexico.

Fowler eluded capture and traveled to Mexico and Cuba. On July 5, 1866, the District Attorney filed a nolle prosequi, saying that he no longer intended to prosecute Fowler for his misdeeds. Some time after that, Fowler returned to the United States.

Fowler died on September 29, 1869 in Chicago, Illinois, and was at the time planning to return to New York City.

References

Further reading
Gustavus Myers, "The History of Tammany Hall", 1901, pp. 229, 232-233
E. J. Edwards, "Tammany: Early Spoilsment and the Reign of the Plug-Uglies", from McClure's Magazine, Vol. IV (Dec. 1894- May. 1895) pp. 574–575
Isaac V. Fowler's obituary from The New York Times, Oct. 1, 1869
"New-York's Postmasters Since 1687" from the New York Times, Oct. 18, 1896

1818 births
1869 deaths
American people of Dutch descent
Leaders of Tammany Hall
Postmasters of New York City
New York (state) Democrats